The white-lipped bright-eyed frog (Boophis albilabris) is a species of frog in the family Mantellidae.
It is endemic to Madagascar. Its natural habitats are subtropical or tropical moist lowland forests, subtropical or tropical moist montane forests, rivers, intermittent rivers, and heavily degraded former forest.
It is threatened by habitat loss.

References

Boophis
Amphibians described in 1888
Endemic frogs of Madagascar
Taxonomy articles created by Polbot